The Guggernell is a mountain of the Plessur Alps, located south of Arosa in the canton of Graubünden. It lies west of the Guggernellgrat.

References

External links
 Guggernell on Hikr

Mountains of the Alps
Mountains of Switzerland
Mountains of Graubünden
Two-thousanders of Switzerland